In enzymology, a thymine dioxygenase is an enzyme that catalyzes the chemical reaction

thymine + 2-oxoglutarate + O2  5-hydroxymethyluracil + succinate + CO2

The 3 substrates of this enzyme are thymine, 2-oxoglutarate, and O2, whereas its 3 products are 5-hydroxymethyluracil, succinate, and CO2.

This enzyme belongs to the family of oxidoreductases, specifically those acting on paired donors, with O2 as oxidant and incorporation or reduction of oxygen. The oxygen incorporated need not be derived from O2 with 2-oxoglutarate as one donor, and incorporation of one atom o oxygen into each donor.  The systematic name of this enzyme class is thymine,2-oxoglutarate:oxygen oxidoreductase (7-hydroxylating). Other names in common use include thymine 7-hydroxylase, 5-hydroxy-methyluracil dioxygenase, and 5-hydroxymethyluracil oxygenase.  It has 2 cofactors: iron,  and Ascorbate.

References

 
 
 

EC 1.14.11
Iron enzymes
Ascorbate enzymes
Enzymes of unknown structure